The Governor of Santa Cruz is a citizen of the Santa Cruz Province, in Argentina, holding the office of governor for the corresponding period. The governor is elected alongside a vice-governor. Since 2015, the governor of Santa Cruz has been Alicia Kirchner.

Governors since 1983

See also
 Chamber of Deputies of Santa Cruz

References

External links
Official site

Governors
Santa Cruz|Governors of Santa Cruz
List